"Ann (Don't Go Runnin')" is a single by American country artist Tommy Overstreet. Released in December 1971, it was the first single from his album This Is Tommy Overstreet. The song peaked at No. 2 on the Billboard Hot Country Singles chart, his highest-charting single on the chart. It also reached No. 1 on the RPM Country Tracks chart in Canada, and was his only chart-topper there.

Charts

Weekly charts

Year-end charts

References

1972 singles
Tommy Overstreet songs
1971 songs
Songs written by Buzz Cason
Dot Records singles